Ababio is a surname. Notable people with the surname include:

Alexander Ransford Ababio (born 1927), Ghanaian politician
Eddie Ababio (born 1988), Ghanaian-American soccer player
Joyce Ababio (born 1988), Ghanaian fashion designer
Odeneho Gyapong Ababio II, Ghanaian traditional ruler
Yaw Ntow Ababio (born 1959), Ghanaian politician

See also
Gottlieb Ababio Adom (1904–1979), Ghanaian educator, journalist, editor and Presbyterian minister
Grace Amponsah-Ababio (born 1941), Ghanaian dentist and diplomat

Ghanaian surnames